Regional School District 3 contains Old Killingly High School, Pomfret Community School, Putnam School District  and Thompson Schools. Regional School District 3 was designed for the Agriculture Wing at Old Killingly High School so they could make it easier to get all the people together.

School districts in Connecticut